Mary Gartside (-1819) was an English water colorist and color theorist. She published three books between 1805 and 1808. In chronological and intellectual terms Mary Gartside can be regarded an exemplary link between Moses Harris, who published his short but important Natural System of Colours around 1766, and Johann Wolfgang von Goethe’s highly influential theory Zur Farbenlehre, first published in 1810. Gartside's colour theory was published privately under the disguise of a traditional water colouring manual. She is the first recorded woman known to have published a theory of colour.

Biography 
Mary Gartside exhibited some of her own artwork, paintings of flowers in watercolor, at the Royal Academy in 1781, at the Botanic Gardens in Liverpool in 1784, and at the Associated Artists in Watercolor in London in 1808. Mary Gartside died near Ludlow on 9 December 1819, aged 64.

Published works 

Between 1805 and 1808 Mary Gartside published three books on painting in watercolour that reflect her interest in colour theory and its applicability. They were, in chronological order: An Essay on Light and Shade, privately published in 1805; Ornamental Groups, Descriptive of Flowers, Birds, Shells, Fruit, Insects etc,. published by William Miller in 1808; and the second, enlarged edition of her first book with the new title An Essay on a New Theory of Colour, published by Gardiner, Miller and Arch in 1808. New Theory of Colour was intended as the first of a three-volume set, but volumes 2 and 3 never appeared. A 10-page pamphlet appears to have preceded An Essay on Light and Shade, and is titled An Essay on Light and Shadow. It does not contain the hand-coloured blots included in the later editions.

Review and commentary 
One of the first scholars to have referenced and discussed her was Frederic Schmid in his book The Practice of Painting (London: Faber and Faber, 1948) and a related essay. 
Her work has recently been discussed by scholars such as Ian C. Bristow, Ann Bermingham, Martin Kemp, Jean-Jacques Rosat  and Raphael Rosenberg. In 2009, Alexandra Loske presented a paper on Gartside's life and work at a research conference in Lewes, United Kingdom.

In 2013, a copy of An Essay on Light and Shade, on Colours, and on Composition in General was included in the exhibition Regency Colour and Beyond, 1785-1850 at the Royal Pavilion in Brighton. Curator Alexandra Loske produced a blog post about this rare book on the Royal Pavilion's official blog, in which all eight colour blots can be seen. A complete set of the blots has also been reproduced in Alexandra Loske's Colour: A Visual History.
Since 2020, Mary Gartside has been featuring in a research project, led by Alexandra Loske) at the Centre for Life History and Life Writing Research (CLHLWR) at the University of Sussex about women in colour history. In January 2020 this project was presented by Loske as a research paper at the University of Edinburgh.

Selected works
 An Essay on Light and Shade, on Colours, and on Composition in General (London, 1805)
 An Essay on a New Theory of Colours, and on Composition in General (London, 1808)
 Ornamental Groups, Descriptive of Flowers, Birds, Shells, Fruit, Insects, &c., and Illustrative of a New Theory of Colouring (London, W. Miller, 1808)

References

External links
 Colour Reference Library, Royal College of Art
 Alexandra Loske Temperamental Roses: On the Beauty of Colour Circles (with a Mary Gartside illustration)
 Digitised version of Gartside's Essay on Light and Shade from 1805 (Heidelberg University)

1755 births
1809 deaths
18th-century English women artists
18th-century English painters
18th-century English women writers
19th-century English painters
19th-century English women writers
19th-century English writers
19th-century English women artists
English watercolourists
English women painters
Women watercolorists